Ashley Higginson (born March 17, 1989) is an American middle-distance runner who has made the U.S. team for the 2013 World Championships in Athletics in the 3000 meter steeplechase.

Life and career
Born in Staten Island, New York, Higginson grew up in Colts Neck Township, New Jersey, and graduated from Colts Neck High School as part of the class of 2007, where she was a NXN (aka Nike Cross Country National) champion and Foot Locker Cross Country Championships All-American. Higginson went on to graduate from Princeton University and Rutgers School of Law–Newark.

In 2008, Higginson competed in 2008 World Junior Championships in Athletics in the women's 5000 meters.

As an undergraduate, Higginson won seven Ivy League Outdoor Championships. This included the 5000 meter titles in 2008 and 2011, 3000 meter titles in 2010 and 2011, and three consecutive 3000 meter steeplechase titles in 2009 through 2011. In 2010, in her junior year at Princeton, she finished third in the NCAA Women's Division I Outdoor Track and Field Championships in the 3000 meter steeplechase.

Higginson placed fourth at the 2012 U.S. Olympic trials in the 3000 meter steeplechase.

Higginson qualified for the 2013 World Championships in Athletics in the 3000 meter steeplechase by placing second in that year's U.S. outdoor championship with a time of 9:46.25. At the 2013 World Championships, she finished in a time of 9:45.78 in the steeplechase event. The result was eleventh in her heat and nineteenth overall. She did not qualify for the final.

Higginson is the 2nd rated American steeplechaser in 2014 running 9:27.59 to earn the silver medal at the 2014 USA Outdoor Track and Field Championships in Sacramento, California, in June. She competed in the Diamond League in Stockholm Bauhaus Athletics on August 22, 2014, finished in 8th with a time of 9:33.89.

Higginson sets Pan Am games 3000 meter steeplechase record in July 2015. after placing 5th at 2015 USA Outdoor Track and Field Championships in Eugene, Oregon.

In 2016, Higginson opened her outdoor season running a 4:33.90 mile at Penn Relays and 4:08.13 in 1500 meters at Hoka One One Middle Distance Classic hosted at Occidental College. She placed 9th in 9:38.55 at 2016 US Olympic Trials (track and field) in steeplechase. Higginson placed 13th in 4:26.1 at 2016 Fifth Avenue Mile.

US Championships
Track and field

References

External links
 
 
 

Living people
1989 births
People from Colts Neck Township, New Jersey
People from Staten Island
Sportspeople from Monmouth County, New Jersey
American female steeplechase runners
Pan American Games medalists in athletics (track and field)
Athletes (track and field) at the 2015 Pan American Games
Princeton University alumni
World Athletics Championships athletes for the United States
Track and field athletes from New Jersey
Pan American Games gold medalists for the United States
Medalists at the 2015 Pan American Games
Track and field athletes from New York City
21st-century American women